Count Faustino Duranti (1695–1766) was an Italian painter, mainly of illumination and miniature portraits. He was also a cleric of the Baroque period, mainly active in his native Brescia. He became an abbot after his brother, Giorgio Duranti's death.

References

18th-century Italian painters
Italian male painters
Painters from Brescia
Italian Baroque painters
1695 births
1766 deaths
18th-century Italian male artists